New Fast Automatic Daffodils (later shortened to New FADS) were an alternative rock group from Manchester, England, active between 1988 and 1995.

History
The band was formed in 1988 by former members of the punk rock group Pariah. Dolan Hewison, Justin Crawford, Perry Saunders and Icarus Wilson-Wright were former students at Manchester Polytechnic, while Andy Spearpoint attended drama school. The name comes from a poem by Adrian Henri that mixed an advertisement for a yellow Dutch car with a Wordsworth poem. Often associated with the 'Madchester' scene of the late 1980s, but never really part of that scene, the band's debut single, "Lions" was released in 1989 on Playtime records (then home to Inspiral Carpets), followed the same year by the Music Is Shit EP. In 1990, they signed to Play It Again Sam Records, September of that year seeing the release of "Fishes Eyes", and debut album Pigeonhole appearing in November, which reached the UK top 50.

In March 1991, the British music magazine, NME, reported that the band were appearing at the 'Great Indie Festival - A Midsummer's Day Dream' at Milton Keynes Bowl in June that year. Also on the bill were 808 State, Gary Clail, Shades of Rhythm, The Shamen, Paris Angels plus Flowered Up. Further singles followed in 1991 and 1992, with second album Body Exit Mind issued in October 1992 (reaching No. 57 in the UK). 1994 saw the band shorten their name to New FADS, with 2 EPs released that year, before a final album, Love It All in 1995. The band split up in 1995.

The band recorded three sessions for John Peel's radio show, the first two of which were compiled onto an album, The Peel Sessions in 1991. Their song "Big" also reached No. 14 in the Festive Fifty in 1990 and featured on the influential 1990 compilation album Happy Daze. Their lone charting success in the United States was the single "Stockholm", which reached No. 30 on the Billboard Modern Rock charts in 1993.

Singer Andy Spearpoint also flirted with acting, having a small part in Coronation Street.

Post band activities
Andy Spearpoint was reported in 2004 to be working as a freelance music teacher. Dolan Hewison is Director of the Greater Manchester Music Action Zone. Icarus Wilson-Wright worked with Basement Jaxx. Justin Crawford is one part of DJ duo Unabombers and has also recorded solo, under the name Only Child.

Discography

Singles
"Lions" (1989, Playtime) 12" tracks:
 Lions
 Fate Don't Fail Me Now
 Your Dreams My Nightmares
"Music Is Shit" EP (1989, Playtime) 12" tracks:
 Beam Me Up
 A Man Without Qualities
 Music Is Shit parts 1-3
CD version (AMUSE 6CD) contained an extra track Lions, taken from the first 12”
"Big" (1990 Amuse 7CD, Playtime) cd tracks:
 Big 6:13
 Big (Baka) 6:30
 Big (Instrumental) 6:32
"Fishes Eyes" (1990 BIAS162 CD, Play It Again Sam) cd tracks:
 Fishes Eyes 6:46
 Fishes Eyes (Underwater) 5:19
 White 3:51
"Get Better" (1991 BIAS193 CD, Play It Again Sam) cd tracks:
 Get Better 4:30
 Pigeonhole (Edit) 4:52
 I Found Myself in Another Room 3:52
 Get Better (Version 1) 4:29
"All Over My Face" (1991 BIAS199 CD, Play It Again Sam) cd tracks:
 All Over My Face 3:53
 All Over My Face (Split Decision) 5:20
 All Over My Face (Off the Road) 4:56
 Why The Hard Man Fail 4:42
"Big" (1991, Playtime, Play It Again Sam & Mute) cd tracks:
 Big (Edit) 4:12
 Big (Baka) 6:30
 Get Better 4:30
 Get Better (Extended) 6:30
 White 3:50
"It's Not What You Know" (1992, Play It Again Sam) cd tracks:
 It's Not What You Know 4:07
 Head On 3:28
 Beatlemania 4:50
 Beautiful 4:40
"Stockholm" (1992, Play It Again Sam) 
cd tracks:
 Stockholm 5:10
 Stockholm (Edit) 4:12
 Cannes 4:25
10" tracks:
 Stockholm (Demo Version)	
 It's Not What You Know (Demo Version)	
 Hexagon Spring
"Bong" (1993, Play It Again Sam) cd tracks:
 Bong 4:06
 It's Not What You Know 4:08
 Head On 3:28
 Beautiful 4:40
 Cannes 4:25
"Life Is An Accident 1" (1994 BIAS249 CD1, Play It Again Sam) (as New FADS) cd tracks:
 Life Is An Accident 3:02
 Every Once In A While (Fuzzy Logic) 6:04
 Aches And Pains 3:50
"Life Is An Accident 2" (1994 BIAS249 CD2, Play It Again Sam) (as New FADS) cd tracks:
 Life Is An Accident 3:02
 PSV (VPL) 7:55
 Mad Pop 3:03
"These Foolish Things" (1994, Play It Again Sam) (as New FADS) 10" tracks:
 These Foolish Things 4:31
 Every Once In A While 4:15

Albums
Pigeonhole (1990, Play It Again Sam) UK No. 49 cd tracks:
 Get Better 3:52
 Fishes Eyes 7:04
 Working for Him 4:17
 Part 4 4:13
 Big 6:08
 You Were Lying When You Said You Loved Me 4:17
 Amplifier 3:57
 Reprise 3:47
 Partial 6:26
 Penguins 3:51
 I Found Myself In Another Room 3:51
 Pigeonhole 6:06

Some vinyl copies of Pigeonhole had a free 7" with a cover of the Velvet Underground's 'I'm Set Free'

The Peel Sessions (1991, Strange Fruit Records) cd tracks:
 Purple Haze 1:46
 Man Without Qualities II 3:19
 Jaggerbog 3:42
 Big 5:32
 Get Better 3:25
 Part 4 4:29
 Man Without Qualities One 4:44

Body Exit Mind (1992, Play It Again Sam) UK No. 57 cd tracks:
 Bong 4:05
 It's Not What You Know 4:07
 Stockholm 5:12
 I Take You To Sleep 3:52
 Bruises 6:58
 How Much Longer Must We Tolerate Mass Culture? 1:19
 Kyphos 4:44
 Teenage Combo 0:25
 Beatlemania 4:50
 What Kind Of Hell Is This? 0:39
 American Money 4:28
 Missing Parts Of Famous People 1:05
 Patchwork Lives 5:08
 Music 8:08
 Exit Body, Exit Mind 1:02

Love It All (1995, Play It Again Sam) (as New FADS) cd tracks:
 These Foolish Things 4:31
 Life Is An Accident 3:02
 Left Right 3:59
 Every Once In a While 4:15
 Why Waste Your Love 3:35
 Monday It Is 4:15
 Saxophone 3:35
 What I Feel 3:52
 PSV 4:15
 Kill My Instincts 3:34
 Souvenir 1:54

Other appearances
 Volume Two - Various Artists (Contains unique mix of "All Over My Face" (Scam Mix))
 “home” - various artists (Contains Jaggerbog) sheer joy records 1990
 Fifteen Minutes: A Tribute to the Velvet Underground (1994, Imaginary Records – ILLCD 047P, includes "I'm Set Free" by New F.A.D.S.
 This Is Fascism (1996, M.C. Projects – PROCD 14. A 2CD collection of remixes of the New Fast Automatic Daffodils cover of the song "This Is Fascism" by Consolidated)

References

External links
discogs.com discography
[ AllMusic Guide profile]
Myspace.com site

Madchester groups
English alternative rock groups
Mute Records artists
Musical groups from Manchester
Musical groups established in 1988
Musical groups disestablished in 1995